The Summer I Turned Pretty is an American coming-of-age romantic drama television series created by author Jenny Han for Amazon Prime Video, and is based on her novel trilogy of the same name. The series premiered on June 17, 2022, with the first season consisting of seven episodes. Ahead of the series premiere, it was renewed for a second season which is set to premiere in 2023.

Synopsis
On an annual summer vacation to their family friends' beach house, Belly reunites with her brother, and friends Jeremiah and Conrad, and she finds herself caught in a love triangle.

Cast and characters

Main

 Lola Tung as Isabel "Belly" Conklin
 Jackie Chung as Laurel Park
 Rachel Blanchard as Susannah Fisher
 Christopher Briney as Conrad Fisher
 Gavin Casalegno as Jeremiah Fisher
 Sean Kaufman as Steven Conklin
 Alfredo Narciso as Cleveland Castillo
 Minnie Mills as Shayla
 Colin Ferguson as John Conklin
 Tom Everett Scott as Adam Fisher

Recurring

 David Iacono as Cam
 Summer Madison as Nicole
 Rain Spencer as Taylor
 Lilah Pate as Gigi
 Kelsey Rose Healey as Dara
 Jocelyn Shelfo as Marisa

Episodes

Production

Development
On February 8, 2021, Amazon gave production a series order consisting of eight episodes. The series is based on the 2009 novel of the same name by Jenny Han. It is created and executive produced by Han. Also executive producing are Gabrielle Stanton, Karen Rosenfelt, Nne Ebong, and Hope Hartman. 
On June 8, 2022, ahead of the series premiere, Amazon renewed the series for a second season.

Casting
On April 28, 2021, Lola Tung, Rachel Blanchard, Jackie Chung, and Christopher Briney were cast as series regulars. In July 2021, Gavin Casalegno, Sean Kaufman, Minnie Mills and Alfredo Narciso joined the main cast, while Summer Madison, David Iacono, Rain Spencer, and Tom Everett Scott joined the cast in recurring roles. On August 31, 2022, Kyra Sedgwick and Elsie Fisher were cast in recurring capacities for the second season.

Filming
Principal photography for the first season took place in 2021 in Wilmington, North Carolina, locations included Carolina Beach, Fort Fisher, and Wave Transit's Padgett Station on N. 3rd Street. Filming of the second season began in July 2022 and concluded in November 2022.<ref>{{cite web|url=The Summer I Turned Pretty' Season 2 Begins Filming|website=Collider|first=Aidan|last=King|date=July 26, 2022|access-date=July 28, 2022}}</ref>

Release
The series premiered on Prime Video on June 17, 2022. The second season is expected to be released in 2023.

Reception
Critical response
The review aggregator website Rotten Tomatoes reported a 91% approval rating with an average rating of 6.9/10, based on 22 critic reviews. The website's critics consensus reads, "The Summer I Turned Pretty doesn't need more time to become a swan, coming out of the gate a solidly charming and sweet rom-com with appeal across generations." Metacritic, which uses a weighted average, assigned a score of 72 out of 100 based on 8 critics, indicating "generally favorable reviews".

Angie Han of The Hollywood Reporter wrote, "As a coming-of-age story, Amazon’s The Summer I Turned Pretty is a cut above. Tenderly written and endearingly acted, it’s sensitive to the subtle but irreversible shifts in self-perception that come with late adolescence — and at the same time clear-eyed enough to understand that teenagers, up to and including its own blushing heroine, sure can act like clueless jerks while they’re figuring out how to wield their newfound powers." Delia Cai of Vanity Fair also gave a positive review, commenting that "the specificity of Laurel’s fantasy summer is ultimately what rescues The Summer I Turned Pretty from being too sticky sweet."

Writing for The Playlist, Marya E. Gates wrote, "Although the voiceover in which [Belly] shares [her] feelings is unevenly deployed, it’s refreshing to see a story that puts the girl in the driver’s seat and gives her the room to work through the contradictions of adolescence and sexual coming-of-age on her own terms." Joyce Slaton of Common Sense Media said the series is "as sweet, light, and refreshing as a soda on ice by the swimming pool...[and] tackles the confusion and loveliness of an awkward coming-of-age."

Abby Cavenaugh of Collider noted "though at some points, the love triangle — or quadrangle, with Cam included — can feel a bit forced, overall this story works on many levels. You grow to really care about these characters and want to see them happy," adding "Belly is the star of the show, and Tung sells every moment of it with her luminous performance."

Impact
Following the series' debut, all three The Summer I Turned Pretty books skyrocketed into the top three spots on Amazon Best Sellers list, with the second book, It's Not Summer Without You, at number one. The artists whose music is used in the show have also seen an increase in streams, sales and followers, with some experiencing up to a 6,000% increase in song sales. Taylor Swift's seventh studio album, Lover'', resurged in sales and streaming, and re-entered the top 40 region of the Billboard 200 chart as well, after three of its songs—"Cruel Summer", "Lover" and "False God"—were featured in the series. The series also had a massive social media reach, with the hashtag #TheSummerITurnedPretty accumulating over 1.3 billion views on TikTok. It generated over 107,000 global posts over launch weekend and 725 million potential impressions across platforms, according to social analytics agency DMS.

References

External links 
 
 

2020s American teen drama television series
2020s romantic drama television series
2022 American television series debuts
Amazon Prime Video original programming
Coming-of-age television shows
English-language television shows
Television series about teenagers
Television series about vacationing
Television series based on American novels
Television series by Amazon Studios
Television shows filmed in North Carolina
Television shows filmed in Wilmington, North Carolina